The Roman Catholic Diocese of Varanasi is a Latin suffragan diocese in the Ecclesiastical province of Agra in northern India' s vast state Uttar Pradesh.

Its cathedral episcopal see is St. Mary's Cathedral in the city of Varanasi.

History 
 Established on 11 July 1946 as Apostolic Prefecture of Gorakhpur, on territory split off from the Diocese of Allahabad, exempt, i.e. directly subject to the Holy See
 17 September 1958: Renamed as Apostolic Prefecture of Benares-Gorakhpur
 Promoted on 5 June 1970 as Diocese of Banaras (Benares), losing its exempt status by becoming a suffragan of the Metropolitan Archdiocese of Agra
 14 May 1971: Renamed as Diocese of Varanasi (as the city had changed its name).

Ordinaries 
(all Latin, Roman Rite)

 Apostolic Prefects of Gorakhpur 
 Father Joseph Emil Malenfant, Capuchin Friars (O.F.M. Cap.) (6 June 1947 – 17 September 1958 see below)
 Apostolic Prefects of Benares-Gorakhpur 
 Joseph Emil Malenfant, O.F.M. Cap. (see above 17 September 1958 – 1970)

 Bishops of Banaras 
 Patrick Paul D'Souza (5 June 1970 – 14 May 1971 see below)
 Bishops of Varanasi 
 Patrick Paul D'Souza (see above 14 May 1971 – 24 February 2007), Vice-President of the Conference of Catholic Bishops of India (1996 – 1998)
 Raphy Manjaly (24 February 2007 – 2013.10.17), later Bishop of Allahabad (India, in the same province) (2013.10.17 – ...)
 Eugene Joseph (2015.05.30 – ...)

References

External links 
 Diocese of Varanasi Official Website 
 GCatholic.org, with incumbent biography links 
 Catholic Hierarchy 

Roman Catholic dioceses in India
Christianity in Uttar Pradesh
Religion in Varanasi
Christian organizations established in 1946
Roman Catholic dioceses and prelatures established in the 20th century
1946 establishments in India